Love After Love is a 2017 American independent drama film starring Chris O'Dowd and Andie MacDowell.  It is the directorial debut of Russell Harbaugh. The film premiered at the Tribeca Film Festival in April 2017, and received a limited release in the United States from IFC Films in March 2018.

Plot
After the death of their father, two sons and their mother face trials and explore new beginnings.

Cast
Chris O'Dowd as Nicholas
Andie MacDowell as Suzanne
James Adomian as Chris
Juliet Rylance as Rebecca
Dree Hemingway as Emilie
Gareth Williams as Glenn
Francesca Faridany as Karen
Matt Salinger as Michael
Romy Byrne as Ashleigh

Reception
On review aggregator website Rotten Tomatoes, the film holds an approval rating of 86% based on 28 reviews, with an average score of 7.6/10. The site's consensus reads: "Love After Love examines the ways in which profound grief can affect a family's dynamic -- and refuses to settle for pat Hollywood answers, much to the viewer's benefit". On Metacritic, the film has a weighted average score of 84 out of 100, based on 14 critics, indicating "universal acclaim".

References

External links
 
 

Films about grieving
American drama films
2017 directorial debut films
American independent films
Films scored by David Shire
2010s English-language films
2010s American films